Henry Wigglesworth (birth registered July→September 1860 – 3 March 1925) was an English rugby union footballer who played in the 1880s. He played at representative level for England, and Yorkshire, and at club level for Thornes F.C. (in Thornes, Wakefield), as a three-quarter, e.g. wing, or centre,

Background
Henry Wigglesworth's birth was registered in Doncaster district, West Riding of Yorkshire, and he died aged 64 in Hunslet, West Riding of Yorkshire.

International honours
Henry Wigglesworth won a cap for England while at Thornes RFC in the 1884 Home Nations Championship in the 1-goal to nil victory over Ireland at Lansdowne Road on Monday 4 February 1884.

County honours
Henry Wigglesworth won caps for Yorkshire, making his début against Northumberland.

Genealogical information
Henry Wigglesworth marriage was registered during July→September 1894 in Hunslet district.

References

External links
Search for "Wigglesworth" at rugbyleagueproject.org

1860 births
1925 deaths
England international rugby union players
English rugby union players
Rugby union players from Doncaster
Rugby union three-quarters
Yorkshire County RFU players